Church of Mother of God of the Rosary is a Roman Catholic church in Soly, Smarhon District, Grodno Region, in Belarus. It is an example of the Belarusian Art Nouveau architecture and was built in 1926–1934. The church is a site of cultural heritage of Belarus.

History 

Soly had a Catholic church from 1589. The church building was destroyed during the Russo-Polish War (1654–1667) and then again in Napoleonic war, but every time was restored.

Modern brick building was built in place of old wooden one in 1926-1934 by architect Adam Dubanovich. The church was active after the Second World War till present day.

Plan of the church

References

External links 

Roman Catholic churches in Belarus
Churches in Belarus
Landmarks in Belarus
Buildings and structures in Grodno Region